Proto-Trans–New Guinea is the reconstructed proto-language ancestral to the Trans–New Guinea languages. Reconstructions have been proposed by Malcolm Ross and Andrew Pawley.

Phonology
Proto-Trans–New Guinea is reconstructed with a typical simple Papuan inventory: five vowels, three phonations of stops at three places,  (Andrew Pawley reconstructs the voiced series as prenasalized ), plus a palatal affricate , the fricative , and the approximants . Syllables are typically (C)V, with CVC possible at the ends of words. Many of the languages have restricted tone systems.

{| class="wikitable" style="text-align: center"
|-
|+Consonants
!  !!bilabial!!apical
!palato-alveolar!!palatal!!velar
|-
!style="text-align: left"|oral stops
| p || t
| ||  || k
|-
!style="text-align: left"|prenasalised stops
| ᵐb || ⁿd
|ᶮʤ
|  || ᵑg
|-
!style="text-align: left"|nasals
| m || n
| || ɲ || ŋ
|-
!style="text-align: left"|fricatives
|
|s
|
|
|
|-
!style="text-align: left"|laterals
|  || l
| ||  || 
|-
!style="text-align: left"|glides
| w || 
| || j || 
|}

The Proto-Trans–New Guinea vowels are reconstructed as having a cross-linguistically frequent five-vowel system:

{| class="wikitable" style="text-align: center"
|-
|+Vowels
!
! Front
!Central
! Back
|-
! Close
| 
|
| 
|-
! Mid
| 
|
| 
|-
! Open
| 
|a
|
|}

Pronouns
Ross reconstructs the following pronominal paradigm for Trans–New Guinea, with *a~*i ablaut for singular~non-singular:

{| class=wikitable
|-
| I || *na || we || *ni
|-
| thou || *ga || you || *gi
|-
| s/he || *(y)a, *ua || they || *i
|}

There is a related but less commonly attested form for 'we', *nu, as well as a *ja for 'you', which Ross speculates may have been a polite form. In addition, there were dual suffixes *-li and *-t, and a plural suffix *-nV, (i.e. n plus a vowel) as well as collective number suffixes *-pi- (dual) and *-m- (plural) that functioned as inclusive we when used in the first person. (Reflexes of the collective suffixes, however, are limited geographically to the central and eastern highlands, and so might not be as old as proto-Trans–New Guinea.)

Morphology
Studies group Madang, Finisterre-Huon, and Kainantu-Goroka together as part of a larger Northeast New Guinea (NENG) group on the basis of morphological evidence, such as mutually reconstructable verbal suffixes that mark subject:

Proto-Northeast New Guinea subject-marking verbal suffixes

{| class="wikitable"
!  !! singular !! dual !! plural
|-
! 1st person
| *-Vn || *-u(l,t) || *-un, *-i
|-
! 2nd person
| *-an
| rowspan="2" | *-i(l,t)
| *-ai, *-i, *-a
|-
! 3rd person
| *-a, *-i || *-ai
|}

Comparison of reconstructions of subject-marking verbal suffixes

{| class="wikitable"
!  !! proto-Northeast New Guinea !! proto-Madang !! proto-Finisterre-Huon !! proto-Kainantu-Goroka !! Proto-Trans–New Guinea (tentative)
|-
! 1sg
| *-Vn || *-in || ? || *-u || *-Vn
|-
! 2sg
| *-an || *-an,*-i || *-an || *-an || *-Vn
|-
! 3sg
| *-a,*-i || *-a,*-an || *-a,*-i || *-ai,*-i || *-a,*-i
|-
! 1du
| *-u(l,t) || -*-u(l,t) || *-u(l,t) || *-ur || *-u(l,t)
|-
! 2/3du
| *-i(l,t) || *-i(l,t) || *-i(l,t) || ? || *-i(l,t)
|-
! 1pl
| *-un,*-i || *-un || *-un || *-un || 
|-
! 2/3pl
| *-ai,*-i,*-a || *-ai,*-i || *-e,*-i || *-a || 
|}

Lexicon
Lexical words, such as *niman 'louse', may also be reconstructed:

Reflexes of *niman 'louse', which attest to an intermediate *iman in the east:
Chimbu–Wahgi: Mid/Nuclear Wahgi 
Engan: Enga & Kewa 
Finisterre–Huon: Kâte , Selepet 
Gogodala 
Kainantu–Goroka: Awa , Tairora , Fore , Gende 
Southern Kiwai 
Koiarian: Managalasi 
Kolopom: Kimaghama , Riantana 
Kwale 
Madang: Kalam , Watiwa (Rai Coast) , Sirva (Adelbert) 
Mek: Kosarek 
Marori 
Paniai Lakes: Ekari  (metathesis?)
Timor–Alor–Pantar: Western Pantar , Oirata  (metathesis?)
Wiru 
Questionable branches:
Pauwasi:  Yafi 
Central Sentani 

The Proto-Trans–New Guinea negative is reconstructed as *ma-. Negatives in Trans–New Guinea languages usually have either an mV- or nV- form.
 *mV (often *ma): Angaatɨha (Angan); Apalɨ, Waskia, Kalam (Madang); Kâte, Kombe (Finisterre-Huon)
 *na ~ *naa: Awara (Finisterre-Huon); Enga, Ku Waru, Middle Wahgi (Chimbu-Wahgi); Oksapmin

Reconstructions

Lexical comparison

For other lexical comparison tables of Papuan languages, see also:
West Papuan languages#Lexical comparison
West Bomberai languages#Lexical comparison
West Papuan Highlands languages#Lexical comparison
Northwest Papuan languages#Lexical comparison
Trans-Fly–Bulaka River languages#Lexical comparison
Papuan Gulf languages#Lexical comparison
Torricelli languages#Lexical comparison
Sepik–Ramu languages#Lexical comparison
East Papuan languages#Lexical comparison

See also
List of Proto-Trans-New Guinea reconstructions (Wiktionary)

Synchronic reflexes
Madang languages#Evolution
Kalam language#Evolution
Apali language#Evolution
Finisterre–Huon languages#Evolution
Kâte language#Evolution
Selepet language#Evolution
Kainantu–Goroka languages#Evolution
Engan languages#Evolution
Chimbu–Wahgi languages#Evolution
Wahgi language#Evolution
East Strickland languages#Evolution
Greater Awyu languages#Evolution
Mandobo language#Evolution
Asmat–Kamrau languages#Evolution
Asmat language#Evolution
Ok languages#Evolution
Telefol language#Evolution
Marind–Yaqai languages#Evolution
Paniai Lakes languages#Evolution
Dani languages#Evolution
Mek languages#Evolution
Wiru language#Evolution
Duna–Pogaya languages#Evolution
Kutubuan languages#Evolution
Kiwaian languages#Evolution
Kiwai language#Evolution
Tirio languages#Evolution
Awin–Pa–Kamula languages#Evolution
Kolopom languages#Evolution
Morori language#Evolution
Gogodala–Suki languages#Evolution
Inland Gulf languages#Evolution
Greater Binanderean languages#Evolution
Binandere language#Evolution
Mailuan languages#Evolution
Dagan languages#Evolution
Goilalan languages#Evolution
Koiarian languages#Evolution
Kwalean languages#Evolution
Yareban languages#Evolution
Manubaran languages#Evolution
Timor–Alor–Pantar languages#Evolution

References

Bibliography

Further reading
Ross, Malcolm. 2014. Proto-Trans-New-Guinea. TransNewGuinea.org.

External links

TransNewGuinea.org - database of the languages of New Guinea (by Simon Greenhill)
Timothy Usher's Newguineaworld site

Trans-New Guinea